Kees Akerboom may refer to:

Kees Akerboom, Jr. (born 1983), Dutch basketball player
Kees Akerboom, Sr. (born 1952), Dutch basketball player